Norman E. Amundson is a professor of counseling psychology at the University of British Columbia.

Biography
Amundson has undertaken research on career development and on Canadian immigration issues. One reviewer said he has "a well-established, international reputation as a scholar and leader in career counselling, but what makes his work singular is that he is a public intellectual whose scholarship can be taken up by diverse communities."

In 2014, Amundson received the NCDA Eminent Career Award, which is the highest honor given by the National Career Development Association.

Publication

References

Canadian psychologists
Academic staff of the University of British Columbia
Living people
Year of birth missing (living people)
Place of birth missing (living people)